The 469th Bombardment Group is a former United States Army Air Forces (AAF) unit. It was activated in May 1943 and served as a Replacement Training Unit until it was disbanded in April 1944 when the AAF reorganized its training and support units in the United States.

History
The 469th Bombardment Group was activated at Pueblo Army Air Base, Colorado on 1 May 1943, but within a week of activation, moved to Alexandria Army Air Base, Louisiana, changing places with the 471st Bombardment Group, which moved from Alexandria to Pueblo.  The movement of the group followed the conversion of Alexandria from an air support training base to a heavy bomber training base and its transfer from Third to Second Air Force.  At Alexandria, it served as a Replacement Training Unit for aircrews flying the Boeing B-17 Flying Fortress.  Replacement Training Units were oversized units that trained individual pilots and aircrews. The group was composed of the 796th, 797th, 798th, and 799th Bombardment Squadrons.  Training began once the group's first B-17 arrived at Alexandria on 1 June.

However, the Army Air Forces (AAF) was finding that standard military units like the 469th, which were assigned personnel and equipment based on relatively inflexible tables of organization were not proving well adapted to the training mission.  In November 1943, most elements of the group were administratively organized as a "Combat Crew Training School".  However this adjustment did not go far enough and in the spring of 1944, the AAF adopted a more functional system in which each base was organized into a separate numbered unit, which was manned and equipped based on the station's requirements. Accordingly, the 469th Group was disbanded, and along with its elements and supporting units at Alexandria was used to form the 221st AAF Base Unit.

The group was reconstituted in July 1985 as the 469th Electronic Warfare Group, but has not been active since.

Lineage
 Constituted as the 469th Bombardment Group (Heavy)
 Activated on 1 May 1943
 Disbanded on 1 April 1944
 Reconstituted and redesignated 469th Electronic Warfare Group on 31 July 1985

Assignments
 16th Bombardment Operational Training Wing, 1 May 1943 – 1 April 1944

Components
 796th Bombardment Squadron: 1 May 1943 – 1 April 1944
 797th Bombardment Squadron: 1 May 1943 – 1 April 1944
 798th Bombardment Squadron: 1 May 1943 – 1 April 1944
 799th Bombardment Squadron: 1 May 1943 – 1 April 1944

Stations
 Pueblo Army Air Base, Colorado, 1 May 1943
 Alexandria Army Air Base, Louisiana, 7 May 1943 – 1 April 1944

Aircraft
 Boeing B-17 Flying Fortress, 1943–1944

References

Notes
 Explanatory notes

 Citations

Bibliography

 
 
 
 
 

Bombardment groups of the United States Army Air Forces
Military units and formations established in 1943
Military units and formations disestablished in 1944
1943 establishments in the United States